Time Travelling Blues is the second album by British stoner metal band Orange Goblin, released in 1998 on Rise Above Records and The Music Cartel. In 2002, it was re-released by Rise Above as a double CD packaged with Frequencies from Planet Ten (1997). This version included  a cover of Trouble's "Black Shapes of Doom" as a bonus track on the Time Travelling Blues disc. This track was originally released on the Bastards Will Pay: A Tribute to Trouble compilation album and was also included on the original Japanese press of Time Travelling Blues.

Track listing

Personnel 
 Ben Ward – vocals
 Pete O'Malley – guitar
 Joe Hoare – guitar
 Martyn Millard – bass
 Chris Turner – drums

References 

1998 albums
Orange Goblin albums
Rise Above Records albums